Francesca Sgorbini (born 7 January 2001) is an Italian rugby union player. She is a third line winger of the Italy women's national rugby union team, and the French club of ASM Clermont Auvergne.

Sgorbini competed at the 2019, 2020, and 2021 Six Nations Championship. She was selected in Italy's squad for the 2021 Rugby World Cup in New Zealand.

References 

Living people
2001 births
Italian rugby union players